Janez Vidic (8 February 1923 – 20 May 1996) was a Slovene painter and illustrator, best known for his oil paintings of landscapes and people as well as his murals.

Vidic was born in Ljubljana in 1923. During the Second World War he was imprisoned in the Gonars and Renicci di Anghiari concentration camps. In 1944 he joined the Slovene Partisans. After the war he studied art at the Academy of Fine Arts, Ljubljana and graduated in 1950.

He won the Levstik Award for his book illustrations three times: in 1950 for his illustrations of Mile Klopčič's Premagane zverine (Defeated Beasts), in 1951 for his illustrations for 's collection of stories Živalske pripovedke (Animal Tales) and in 1952 for the picture book Letni časi (The Seasons).

He received the Prešeren Foundation Award in 1977 for his paintings exhibited in Maribor in 1976.

References

Slovenian male painters
Slovenian illustrators
1923 births
1996 deaths
Yugoslav Partisans members
Levstik Award laureates
Ethnic Slovene people
University of Ljubljana alumni
20th-century Slovenian painters
20th-century Slovenian male artists
Artists from Ljubljana